The Master is an Indonesian reality television show aired on RCTI.  It is a competition between stage magicians in which the winner is decided by viewer vote.  It first aired 6 February 2009, and has the slogan "Mencari Bintang Tanpa Mantera" ("Finding a star without charm"). The show consists of some magicians performing their magic and trying to become The Master. In every episode, one contestant who receives the lowest SMS vote is eliminated from the competition. After each act, the judges (3–4) give their comments. The host is Nico Siahaan.  The Master became Indonesia's most popular TV series, with 11.4 million viewers.

Produced by Fabian Dharmawan, who is also the show runner for Indonesian Idol 2012 and X Factor Indonesia, The Master sets a very high standard for a talent search show which still holds a record breaking performance in TV ratings, 11.4/44 in audience share in the finale of The Master: Duel Inauguration Limbad VS Joe Sandy in 2009.

Performers

Host

Judge

Winner

Achievement 
 2010 Panasonic Gobel Awards for favorite talent show

Indonesian reality television series
RCTI original programming
Television magic shows
2009 Indonesian television series debuts
2012 Indonesian television series endings